The Maan massacre was a reported massacre of Alawites in the village of Ma'an, Syria on 9 February 2014.

Events
On 9 February 2014, rebels of the Jund al-Aqsa group attacked and captured the Alawite village of Maan, in Hama province, killing 21 civilians as well as 20 pro-government militiamen according to the Syrian Observatory for Human Rights (SOHR). SOHR said that 14 of them were women. 

The Syrian government gave a much higher death toll, initially claiming 42 civilians were killed and later 60, most of them women, children and the elderly. The government blamed Nusra Front; however, rival rebel group Ahrar al-Sham said that its fighters collaborated with another group to kill around 50 pro-government fighters in the village and denied that the Nusra Front was involved.

Aftermath
United Nations Secretary-General Ban Ki-moon later expressed great shock at the "dozens" reported dead and demanded that "perpetrators of this massacre" be brought to justice.

The massacre caused demonstrations against Al Qaeda, Al Nusra Front, and the ruling Justice and Development Party by the Alawite community in Hatay, Mersin, Istanbul and other  Turkish cities.

On 17 February 2014, the Syrian Army recaptured Maan "after shelling and fighting.".

See also

 List of massacres during the Syrian Civil War

References

Massacres of the Syrian civil war in 2014
Hama Governorate in the Syrian civil war
Massacres of the Syrian civil war perpetrated by the al-Nusra Front
Persecution of Alawites